Events in the year 1903 in Spain.

Incumbents
Monarch: Alfonso XIII
Prime Minister -
 until 20 July - Francisco Silvela Le Vielleuze
 20 July-5 December - Raimundo Fernández Villaverde
 starting 5 December - Antonio Maura Montaner

Births

April 24 - José Antonio Primo de Rivera, politician (d. 1936)

References

 
Years of the 20th century in Spain
1900s in Spain
Spain
Spain